Terranova Sappo Minulio is a comune (municipality) in the Province of Reggio Calabria in the Italian region Calabria, located about  southwest of Catanzaro and about  northeast of Reggio Calabria.

Terranova Sappo Minulio borders the following municipalities: Molochio, Taurianova, Varapodio.

Demographic evolution

References

External links
 www.comune.terranovasappominulio.rc.it/

Cities and towns in Calabria